There have been two baronetcies created for persons with the surname Hughes, one in the Baronetage of Great Britain and one in the Baronetage of the United Kingdom. One creation is extant as of 2008.

The Hughes Baronetcy, of East Bergholt in the County of Suffolk, was created in the Baronetage of Great Britain on 17 July 1773 Richard Hughes, a captain in the Royal Navy and Commissioner of Portsmouth Dockyard. The second Baronet was an Admiral of the Red and was second-in-command under Lord Howe during the Relief of Gibraltar in 1782. He also served as Lieutenant Governor of Nova Scotia. The tenth Baronet was high sheriff of Suffolk from 1923 to 1924.

The Hughes Baronetcy, of Denford in the County of Berkshire, was created in the Baronetage of the United Kingdom on 10 July 1942 for Thomas Harrison Hughes. The title became extinct on his death in 1958.

Hughes baronets, of East Bergholt (1773)

Sir Richard Hughes, 1st Baronet (–1779)
Sir Richard Hughes, 2nd Baronet (c. 1729–1812)
Sir Robert Hughes, 3rd Baronet (1739–1814)
Sir Richard Hughes, 4th Baronet (1768–1833)
Sir Richard Hughes, 5th Baronet (1803–1863)
Sir Edward Hughes, 6th Baronet (1807–1871)
Sir Frederick Hughes, 7th Baronet (1816–1889)
Sir Thomas Collingwood Hughes, 8th Baronet (1800–1889)
Sir Alfred Hughes, 9th Baronet (1825–1898)
Sir (Alfred) Collingwood Hughes, 10th Baronet (1854–1932)
Sir Reginald Johansson Hughes, 11th Baronet (1882–1945)
Sir Robert Heywood Hughes, 12th Baronet (1865–1951)
Sir Richard Edgar Hughes, 13th Baronet (1897–1970)
Sir David Collingwood Hughes, 14th Baronet (1936–2003)
Sir Thomas Collingwood Hughes, 15th Baronet (born 1966)

Hughes baronets, of Denford (1942)
Sir Thomas Harrison Hughes, 1st Baronet (1881–1958)

See also
Hughes-Hunter baronets
Hughes-Morgan baronets

Notes

References
Kidd, Charles, Williamson, David (editors). Debrett's Peerage and Baronetage (1990 edition). New York: St Martin's Press, 1990,

External links
Daily Telegraph obituary of Sir David Collingwood Hughes, 14th Baronet

Baronetcies in the Baronetage of Great Britain
Extinct baronetcies in the Baronetage of the United Kingdom
1773 establishments in Great Britain
1942 establishments in the United Kingdom